Georgios Petreas (born 19 November 1986, in Kalamata, Greece) is a Greek male volleyball player. He is the captain of the Greece men's national volleyball team. On club level he plays for Panathinaikos.

Sporting achievements

National Team
 2018  Mediterranean Games (Tarragona, Spain)

Clubs

International competitions
 2017/2018   CEV Challenge Cup, with Olympiacos Piraeus

National championships
 2007/2008  Greek Championship, with Iraklis Thessaloniki 
 2017/2018  Greek Championship, with Olympiacos Piraeus
 2018/2019  Greek Championship, with Olympiacos Piraeus

National Cups
 2015/2016  French Cup, with Gazélec Ajaccio
 2016/2017  French Cup, with Gazélec Ajaccio

National League Cups
 2017/2018  Greek League Cup, with Olympiacos Piraeus
 2018/2019  Greek League Cup, with Olympiacos Piraeus

National Super Cups
 2007  Greek Super Cup, with Iraklis Thessaloniki
 2016  French Super Cup, with Gazélec Ajaccio

References

External links
 Giorgos Petreas' full profile at volleyball-movies.net
 Giorgos Petreas at the International Volleyball Federation
 
 The return of Petreas in Olympiacos Piraeus at olympiacossfp.gr
 

1986 births
Living people
Greek men's volleyball players
Olympiacos S.C. players
Aris V.C. players
Iraklis V.C. players
PAOK V.C. players
Panathinaikos V.C. players
Sportspeople from Kalamata
Competitors at the 2018 Mediterranean Games
Mediterranean Games bronze medalists for Greece
Mediterranean Games medalists in volleyball